Christopher Charles John (born January 5, 1960) is an American politician and lobbyist who from 1997 to 2005 served as a Democratic member of the United States House of Representatives for Louisiana's 7th congressional district, since disbanded and merged into the 3rd district.

Early life

Chris John was born in Crowley in Acadia Parish, one of six children, and reared as a Roman Catholic. He is of Lebanese, French, and German extraction. He attended Notre Dame Catholic High School in Crowley and Louisiana State University in Baton Rouge. He was a page while his father, John N. John, III, was a member of the Louisiana House of Representatives. In the early 1980s, he was elected to the Crowley City Council.

State politics
Chris John first became a member of the Louisiana House of Representatives before he entered the U.S. House. In what was considered a major upset at the time, John defeated the state House incumbent, the former director of the Louisiana State Police, Donald Thibodeaux, in October 1987, by 54 to 46 percent.

Thibodeaux had won a full term in 1983 after having won a special election the year before to fill the unexpired term of John's father, who died in an automobile accident. Chris John served in the state House until 1996, when he finished third with 15 percent of the statewide vote in the 1995 race for lieutenant governor behind the eventual winner (and, who, eight years later, in 2003, became Louisiana's first female chief executive) Kathleen Babineaux Blanco. John narrowly lost the general election berth against Blanco to a fellow state representative, Republican Suzanne Mayfield Krieger of Slidell in St. Tammany Parish.

Terms in Congress: Representative, and run for Senate
In 1996, John was elected to Congress. He defeated fellow Democrat Hunter Lundy in a runoff for the 7th district seat. In 2004, John surrendered his House seat to run for the seat in the U.S. Senate  being vacated by popular Democrat and fellow Crowley native John Breaux, who endorsed him.

John, however, was defeated by Republican David Vitter of the New Orleans suburbs in the primary, Vitter garnered 51 percent of the vote, compared to 29 percent for John. The remainder of the ballots was split between then State Treasurer John Neely Kennedy and the African-American then-state senator Arthur Morrell, both Democrats. John's seat in the House fell into Republican hands, as Charles Boustany won the 7th district with 55 percent of the vote against Democrat Willie Landry Mount. Kennedy later switched parties and succeeded Vitter as senator in 2017.

Post-political career
John is married to Payton Smith of Leesville, whose father, John R. Smith, is a member of the Louisiana State Senate and a former state House member. The Johns have two sons, who are twins. After his House career ended, John worked for two years as a lobbyist in Washington, D.C. Since August 2007, he has made his home in Lafayette, where he is chief lobbyist for the United States Oil and Gas Association. (Morning Advocate).

In 2009, John was inducted into the Louisiana Political Museum and Hall of Fame in Winnfield.

Electoral history

*No vote totals were recorded in 1998.  Section 511 of Title 18 of the Louisiana Revised Statutes, as amended, provides that a candidate who is unopposed is declared elected by the people and his/her name shall not appear on the ballot in either the Primary or General Election.

See also
List of Arab and Middle-Eastern Americans in the United States Congress

References

External links
 
 

|-

|-

|-

|-

1960 births
21st-century American politicians
American lobbyists
American people of French descent
American people of German descent
American politicians of Lebanese descent
Catholics from Louisiana
Democratic Party members of the United States House of Representatives from Louisiana
Living people
Louisiana city council members
Louisiana State University alumni
Democratic Party members of the Louisiana House of Representatives
People from Crowley, Louisiana
Politicians from Lafayette, Louisiana
Members of Congress who became lobbyists